Midhisho, also referred to as Medeshi or Medishe, is a small town in Erigavo District of the Sanaag region of Somaliland.

Demographics 
The Midhisho Valley is predominantly inhabited by the Habar Yoonis sub-division of the Garhajis Isaaq as well as the Naleye Ahmed sub-sub section of the Mohamoud Garad branch of the Dhulbahante.

References

Populated places in Sanaag